A House Divided is a 1931 American Pre-Code drama film directed by William Wyler and starring Walter Huston, Douglass Montgomery (billed as Kent Douglass) and Helen Chandler. It was produced and released by Universal Pictures.

Plot
A widowed fisherman (Huston) falls in love with and marries a younger woman (Chandler), who falls in love with the man's son (Montgomery).

Cast
 Walter Huston as Seth Law
 Douglass Montgomery as 	Matt Law 
 Helen Chandler as Ruth Evans
 Mary Foy as 	Mary
 Lloyd Ingraham as 	Doctor
 Charles Middleton as 	Minister
 Frank Hagney as Big Bill
 Richard Alexander as Sailor 
 Walter Brennan as 	Musician 
 Mary Gordon as 	Townswoman 
 Gibson Gowland as 	Bartender 
 Marjorie Main as Townswoman at Wedding 
 Vivien Oakland as 	Bess 
 Rose Plumer as 	Wedding Guest

References

External links

1931 films
Universal Pictures films
Films directed by William Wyler
Films with screenplays by John Huston
1931 drama films
American drama films
American black-and-white films
1930s American films
1930s English-language films